Maloyablonovo is a rural locality (a selo) in Prokhorovsky District, Belgorod Oblast, Russia. The population was 201 as of 2010. There are 3 streets.

Geography 
Maloyablonovo is located 16 km south of Prokhorovka (the district's administrative centre) by road. Plota is the nearest rural locality.

References 

Rural localities in Prokhorovsky District